This is a list of prominent figures on the topic of nationalism.

Early leaders
 Theobald Wolfe Tone (Ireland)
 Ram Mohan Roy (India)
 George Washington (United States)
 Thomas Jefferson (United States)
 Alexander Hamilton (United States)
 James Madison (United States)

19th-century nationalism
 Napoleon (France)
 Napoleon III (France)
 José Rizal (Philippines)
 Toussaint L'Ouverture (Haiti)
 Count Ioannis Kapodistrias (Greece)
 Eugenio María de Hostos (Puerto Rico)
 Abd-el-Kader (Algeria)
 Ramón Emeterio Betances (Puerto Rico)
 José Gervasio Artigas (Uruguay)
 Simón Bolívar (Venezuela/South America)
 José Gaspar Rodríguez de Francia (Paraguay)
 Theodor Herzl (Jews)
 Lola Rodríguez de Tio (Puerto Rico)
 Miguel Hidalgo (Mexico)
 Lajos Kossuth (Hungary)
 Lajos Batthyány (Hungary)
 Artúr Görgei (Hungary)
 Karađorđe (Serbia)
 Otto von Bismarck (Germany)
 José de Diego (Puerto Rico)
 José Martí (Cuba)
 Segundo Ruiz Belvis (Puerto Rico)
 Hryhoriy Yakhymovych (Ukraine)
 Francisco de Miranda (Venezuela/South America)
 Sheikh Hassan Barsane (Somalia)
 Francisco Morazán (Honduras/Central America)
 José María Morelos (Mexico)
 Antonio Nariño (Colombia)
 Daniel O'Connell (Ireland)
 Bernardo O'Higgins (Chile/South America)
 Ernest Renan (France)
 Alexander I (Russia)
 Theodoros Kolokotronis (Greece)
 Giuseppe Mazzini (Italy)
 José de San Martín (Argentina/South America)
 Ante Starčević (Croatia)
 Ľudovít Štúr (Slovakia)
 Antonio José de Sucre (Venezuela/South America)
 Theodore Roosevelt (United States)
 Pedro Albizu Campos (Puerto Rico)
 Petar II Petrović-Njegoš (Montenegro/Serbia)

National unification
 Eugenio María de Hostos (Antilles' Confederacy)
 Otto von Bismarck (Germany)
 Giuseppe Garibaldi (Italy)
 Toyotomi Hideyoshi (Japan)
 Aden Abdullah Osman Daar (Somalia)
 Tokugawa Ieyasu (Japan)
 Sir John A. Macdonald (Canada)
 Sir George-Étienne Cartier (Canada)
 Ivan the Terrible (Russia)
 Giuseppe Mazzini (Italy)
 Oda Nobunaga (Japan)
 Qin Shihuangdi (China)
 Pedro Albizu Campos (Latin America)
 Simón Bolívar (Gran Colombia)
 Oliver Cromwell (Britain)
 Sardar Vallabhbhai Patel (India)
 Abraham Lincoln (United States)
 Alexander Karađorđević (Yugoslavia)

Nationalist leaders of 20th-century nation states

 Michel Aflaq (Arab)
 Habib Bourguiba (Tunisia)
 Abdullahi Issa Mohamud (Somalia)
 Adolf Hitler (Germany)
 Józef Piłsudski (Poland)
 Mustafa Kemal Atatürk (Turkey)
 Bülent Ecevit (Turkey)
 Eleftherios Venizelos (Greece)
 Ghazi (Iraq)
 Norodom Sihanouk (Cambodia)
 Mao Zedong (People's Republic of China)
 Deng Xiaoping (People's Republic of China)
 Ho Chi Minh (Vietnam)
 Mykhailo Hrushevsky (Ukraine)
 Miklós Horthy (Hungary)
 Ante Pavelić (Croatia)
 Franjo Tuđman (Croatia)
 Mohammad Ali Jinnah (Pakistan)
 Mohammad Iqbal (Pakistan)
 Chaudhry Rehmat Ali (Pakistan)
 Modibo Keita (Mali)
 Jomo Kenyatta (Kenya)
 Kim Il-sung (North Korea)
 Syngman Rhee (South Korea)
 Patrice Lumumba (Democratic Republic of the Congo)
 Norman Manley (Jamaica)
 Ruben Um Nyobe (Cameroon)
 Konstantinos Mitsotakis (Greece)
 Muhammad V of Morocco (Morocco)
 Mujibur Rahman (Bangladesh)
 Juan Domingo Perón (Argentina)
 Gamal Abdel Nasser (Egypt/Arabs)
 Mohandas Karamchand Gandhi (India)
 Kwame Nkrumah (Ghana)
 Sam Nujoma (Namibia)
 Milton Obote (Uganda)
 Sylvanus Olympio (Togo)
  Sir Lynden Pindling (The Bahamas)
 Louis Rwagasore (Burundi)
 Thomas Sankara (Burkina Faso)
 Antanas Smetona (Lithuania)
 Sukarno (Indonesia)
 Ahmed Sékou Touré (Guinea)
 Eric Williams (Trinidad and Tobago)
 Ziaur Rahman (Bangladesh)
 Nelson Mandela (South Africa)
 Josip Broz Tito (Yugoslavia)

20th-century nationalist regimes
 António Salazar (Portugal)
 Adolf Hitler (Germany) 
 Konrad Adenauer (Germany) 
 Helmut Kohl (Germany) 
 Fulgencio Batista (Cuba)
 Plaek Phibulsonggram (Thailand)
 Sarit Thanarat (Thailand)
 Thanom Kittikachorn (Thailand)
 Prem Tinsulanon (Thailand)
 Chatchai Choonhavan (Thailand)
 Sun Yat-sen (Republic of China)
 Chiang Kai-shek (Republic of China)
 Mao Zedong (People's Republic of China)
 Deng Xiaoping (People's Republic of China)
 Józef Piłsudski (Poland)
 Mustafa Kemal Atatürk (Turkey) 
 İsmet İnönü (Turkey)
 Mohammad Reza Pahlavi (Iran)
 Habib Bourguiba (Tunisia)
 Sukarno (Indonesia)
 Suharto (Indonesia)
 Benito Mussolini (Italy)
 Francisco Franco (Spain)
 Andrej Hlinka (Slovakia)
 Gerardo Machado (Cuba)
 Charles De Gaulle (France)
 Georges Pompidou (France)
 Rhee Syangman (South Korea)
 Park Chung Hee (South Korea)
 Chun Doo Hwan (South Korea)
 Ferdinand E. Marcos (Philippines)
 Lee Kuan Yew (Singapore)
 Tunku Abdul Rahman (Malaysia)
 Daniel Malan (South Africa)
 Maximiliano Hernández Martínez (El Salvador)
 Ioannis Metaxas (Greece)
 Ion Antonescu (Romania)
 Gamal Abdel Nasser (Egypt)
Hassan II (Morocco)
Hussein (Jordan)
 Stylianos Pattakos (Greece)
 Juan Perón (Argentina)
 Ante Pavelić (Croatia)
 Franjo Tuđman (Croatia)
 Alija Izetbegović (Bosnia and Herzegovina)
 Slobodan Milošević (SR Jugosavia)
 Juan Velasco Alvarado (Peru)
 Reza Shah (Iran)
 Jozef Tiso (Slovakia)
 Hideki Tojo (Japan)
 Rafael Trujillo (Dominican Republic)
 Getúlio Vargas (Brazil)
 Eleazar López Contreras (Venezuela)
 Fidel Castro (Cuba)
 Kim Il-Sung (North Korea)
 Nicolae Ceaușescu (Romania)
 Ho Chi Minh (Vietnam)
 Pol Pot (Cambodia)
 Lon Nol (Cambodia)

20th-century nationalist resistance
 Hassan II of Morocco (Morocco)
 James Connolly (Ireland)
 Marcus Garvey (Pan Africanist who lived in Jamaica, the United States and the United Kingdom)
 Henri Bourassa (Canada)
 Rubén Berríos Martínez (Puerto Rico)
 Stepan Bandera (Ukraine)
 Draža Mihailović (Yugoslavia - Serbia)
 Yasser Arafat (Palestine)
 Emilio Aguinaldo (Philippines)
 Mustafa Barzani (Kurdistan)
 Mahatma Gandhi (India)
 Dedan Kimathi (Kenya)
 Francis Ona (Bougainville)
 Juan Dalmau Ramírez (Puerto Rico)
 Augusto César Sandino (Nicaragua)
 Andimba Toivo ja Toivo (Namibia)
 Michael Collins (Ireland)
 Pedro Albizu Campos (Puerto Rico)
 Sean MacStiofain (Ireland)
 Cathal Goulding (Ireland)
 Bobby Sands (Ireland)
 Manuel Rodríguez Orellana (Puerto Rico)
 Nelson Mandela (South Africa)
 Abdullah Öcalan (Turkish Kurdistan)
 Fernando Martín (Puerto Rico)
 Mohammed Mosaddeq (Iran)
 Robert Sobukwe (South Africa)
 Gilberto Concepción de Gracia (Puerto Rico)
 Lolita Lebrón (Puerto Rico)
 René Lévesque (Canada/Quebec)
 Vietminh (Vietnam)
 Vietcong (Vietnam)
 Amin al-Husseini (Arab/Palestine)

21st-century nationalist leaders

 Muammar Gaddafi (Libya)
 Xi Jinping (People's Republic of China)
 Vladimir Putin (Russia)
 Dmitri Medvedev (Russia)
 Antonis Samaras (Greece)
 Benjamin Netanyahu (Israel)
 Narendra Modi (India)
 Tomislav Nikolić (Serbia)
 Viktor Orbán (Hungary)
 Kim Jong-il (Democratic People's Republic of Korea)
 Kim Jong-Un (Democratic People's Republic of Korea)
 Nicolás Maduro (Venezuela)
 Leonel Brizola (Brazil)
 Shinzo Abe (Japan)
 Thaksin Shinnawatra (Thailand) 
 Andrés Manuel López Obrador (Mexico)
 Ali Khamenei (Iran)
 Omar al-Bashir (Sudan)
 Bashar al-Assad (Syria)
 Than Shwe (Myanmar)
 Min Aung Hlaing (Myanmar)
 Lao People's Revolutionary Party (Lao People's Democratic Republic)
 ZANU-PF(Zimbabwe)
 National Council for the Defense of Democracy – Forces for the Defense of Democracy (Burundi)
 Communist party of Cuba (Cuba)
 Daniel Ortega (Nicaragua)
 Alexander Lukashenko (Belarus)
 Hun Sen (Cambodia)
 Isaias Afwerki (Eritrea)
 Jeanine Áñez (Bolivia)
 Ilham Aliyev (Azerbaijan)
 Islam Karimov (Uzbekistan)
 Shavkat Mirziyoyev (Uzbekistan)
 Saparmurat Niyazov (Turkmenistan)
 Gurbanguly Berdimuhamedow (Turkmenistan)
 Emomali Rahmon (Tajikistan)
 Nursultan Nazarbayev and Nur Otan (Kazakhstan)
 Andrzej Duda (Poland)
 Communist Party of Vietnam (Vietnam)
 Gotabaya Rajapaksa (Sri Lanka)
 Salman bin Abdulaziz Al Saud (Saudi Arabia)
 Hugo Chavez (Venezuela)
 Donald Trump (United States)
 Min Aung Hlaing (Myanmar)

20th and 21st-century nationalists
 Rubén Berríos Martínez (Puerto Rico)
 David Orchard (Canada)
 Gerry Adams (Ireland)
 Mark Durkan (Ireland)
 Nick Griffin (United Kingdom)
 Mel Hurtig (Canada)
 Maude Barlow (Canada)
 Jared Taylor (United States)
 Nigel Farage (United Kingdom)
 Juan José Ibarretxe (Basque Country)
 Meir Kahane (Israel)
 Toshio Tamogami (Japan)
 Plínio Salgado (Brazil)
 Augustus Invictus (United States)
 Sabino Arana (Basques)
 Xabier Arzalluz (Basque Country)
 Richard Barnbrook (United Kingdom)
 Christoph Blocher (Switzerland)
 Umberto Bossi (Italy)
 Andrew Brons (United Kingdom)
 Noel Gallagher (United Kingdom)
 Tommy Robinson (United Kingdom)
 Anto Đapić (Croatia)
 Roman Dmowski (Poland)
 Hossein Fatemi (Iran)
 Gianfranco Fini (Italy)
 Dariush Forouhar (Iran)
 Pim Fortuyn (Netherlands)
 Nick Griffin (United Kingdom)
 Jörg Haider (Austria)
 Pauline Hanson (Australia)
 Shintaro Ishihara (Japan)
 Jean-Marie Le Pen (France)
 Marine Le Pen (France)
 Alex Salmond (Scotland)
 Nicola Sturgeon (Scotland)
 Vladimír Mečiar (Slovakia)
 Ali Mohamed Osoble (Somalia)
 Juan Dalmau Ramírez (Puerto Rico)
 Claro M. Recto (Philippines)
 Maria de Lourdes Santiago (Puerto Rico)
 Enéas Carneiro (Brazil)
 Antun Saadeh (Lebanon)
 Matteo Salvini (Italy)
 Vojislav Šešelj (Serbia)
 Vuk Drašković (Serbia)
 Željko Ražnatović "Arkan" (Serbia)
 Radovan Karadžić (Republika Srpska)
 Volen Siderov (Bulgaria)
 Dimitar Stoyanov (Bulgaria)
 Corneliu Vadim Tudor (Romania)
 Éamon de Valera (Ireland)
 Geert Wilders (The Netherlands)
 Vladimir Zhirinovsky (Russia)
 Begum Khaleda Zia (Bangladesh)
 Yoram Hazony (Irsael)
 Gregor Strasser (Germany)
 Otto Strasser (Germany)
 Dietrich Eckart (Germany)
 Jimmie Åkesson (Sweden)
 Josh Hawley (United States)
 Lauren Boebert (United States)
 Marjorie Taylor Greene (United States)
 Matt Gaetz (United States)
 Mary Miller (United States)
 Joseph Goebbels (Germany)
 Gabriele D'Annunzio (Italy)

Intellectual and Artistic Figures
 Jean-Jacques Rousseau (Switzerland - Geneva)
 Robert Burns (Scotland)
 Johann Gottfried von Herder (Germany)
 W.B. Yeats (Ireland)
 Rabindranath Tagore (India)

References